Sarah Sands (née Harvey; 3 May 1961) is a British journalist and author. A former editor of the London Evening Standard, she was editor of Today on BBC Radio 4 from 2017 to 2020.

Early life and education
Sands was born in Cambridge, in 1961, to parents in the overseas civil service. Sands is the younger sister of Kit Hesketh-Harvey, of musical duo Kit and The Widow. She was educated at Kent College in Pembury, on the outskirts of Tunbridge Wells in Kent, then a Methodist, now interdenominational, boarding and day independent school for girls. She later attended Goldsmiths, University of London.

Career
Sands trained on The Sevenoaks Chronicle as a news reporter, before moving to the Evening Standard, initially as editor of the Londoner's Diary, before taking further posts as features editor and associate editor. She joined The Daily Telegraph in 1996 as deputy editor, under Charles Moore, later assuming responsibility for the Saturday edition.

Sands was appointed editor of The Sunday Telegraph in June 2005, succeeding Dominic Lawson. She was the first female in the post. Her plan for the paper's November 2005 relaunch was that it should be "like an iPod – full of your favourite things". However, the makeover was not well regarded by senior management, and in an abrupt move, after just eight months and 20 days in post, Sands was sacked as editor of the newspaper on 7 March 2006  by Andrew Neil and replaced by Patience Wheatcroft. Subsequently, many of her changes under her editorship were reversed (including changes to the title font).

In April 2006, Sands was appointed consultant editor on the Daily Mail.

In February 2008 she was appointed editor-in-chief of the UK edition of Reader's Digest. In February 2009 it was announced that she would be taking up the role of deputy editor on London Evening Standard. She became editor of the London Evening Standard following Geordie Greig's departure for The Mail on Sunday in March 2012.

In January 2017, she was appointed editor of the BBC Radio 4 Today programme and took up her appointment later in the year. Sands resigned from the post in late January 2020, the day after major cuts to BBC News were announced.

Sands is the Deputy Chair of the British Council, was Chair of the Gender Equality Advisory Council for G7 for 2021 and is on the council for 2022. She is a Trustee of the Science Museum, Partner at Hawthorn Advisors and Board Member of Channel 4 and the Berkeley Group. She is an ambassador for Global Partnership for Education, an Associate at the IWM and former Trustee of Index on Censorship.

Sands is an honorary fellow of Goldsmiths College, University of London, Lucy Cavendish College Cambridge and a visiting fellow to the Reuters Institute. She has written four novels: her most recent book is The Interior Silence: 10 Lessons from Monastic Life (2021).

Personal life
Sands's first marriage was to the actor Julian Sands, with whom she had a son; the couple divorced in 1987.

Her second marriage was to Kim Fletcher, a former editorial director of the Telegraph group and editor of The Independent on Sunday, with whom she has two children.

References

1961 births
21st-century English novelists
Living people
Alumni of Goldsmiths, University of London
British newspaper editors
English journalists
People educated at Kent College, Pembury
People from Royal Tunbridge Wells